Imbabazi: The Pardon is a 2013 Rwandan film, the debut feature film of director Joël Karekezi.

Imbabazi: The Pardon was made on a low budget, with actors performing for free, and shot in Uganda. The film grew out of Karekezi's earlier short film, The Pardon (2009), which won the Golden Impala Award at the Amakula Film Festival. It received a development award from Gothenburg Film Festival, where it premiered on 28 January 2013. It was also shown at San Diego Black Film Festival, Pan African Film Festival, Fespaco and Seattle International Film Festival 2013.

Plot
The film follows two former friends, Manzi and Karemera, whose lives diverge during the 1994 Rwandan genocide. Manzi joins Hutu Power, while Karemara's life is in danger as a Tutsi. Fifteen years later Manzi is released from prison and tries to make amends for his violent past.

Cast
 Wilson Egessa as Karemera
 Joel Okuyo Atiku Prynce as Manzi
 Rehema Nanfuka as Alice
 Michael Wawuyo as Kalisa

Awards
 Nominee, Best Child Actor, Africa Movie Academy Awards 2013.
 Nominee, Audience Choice Award, Chicago International Film Festival 2013
 Nominee, Political Film Award, Hamburg Film Festival 2013
 Winner, Nile Grand Prize, Luxor African Film Festival 2014

References

External links
 

2013 films
Rwandan drama films
English-language Rwandan films
Rwandan genocide films
Films shot in Rwanda
2010s English-language films